Gordon Pierson (born May 21, 1971) is an American politician who served in the Montana House of Representatives from 2013 to 2021.

Pierson unsuccessfully ran for District 39 of the Montana Senate in 2020.

References

1971 births
Living people
People from Deer Lodge, Montana
21st-century American politicians
Democratic Party members of the Montana House of Representatives